Izvorul Alb may refer to the following rivers in Romania:

 Izvorul Alb (Asău), a tributary of the Asău in Bacău County
 Izvorul Alb, a tributary of the Bistra Mărului
 Izvorul Alb, a tributary of the Bistrița in Neamț County
 Izvorul Alb, a tributary of the Cracăul Alb in Neamț County
 Izvorul Alb (Moldova), a tributary of the Moldova in Suceava County
 Izvorul Alb, a tributary of the Uz in Bacău County

See also 
 Albac (disambiguation)
 Izvorul (disambiguation)
 Râul Alb (disambiguation)